"May It Be" is a song by the Irish recording artist Enya. She and Roma Ryan composed it for Peter Jackson's 2001 film The Lord of the Rings: The Fellowship of the Ring. The song entered the German Singles Chart at number one in 2002, and Enya performed it at the 74th Academy Awards. "May It Be" was acclaimed by music critics and received nominations for the Academy Award for Best Original Song, the Golden Globe Award for Best Original Song, and the Grammy Award for Best Song Written for Visual Media.

Composition 

Director Peter Jackson approached Enya (under the suggestion of Howard Shore), asking if she would be interested in writing a song for The Lord of the Rings. Thrilled at the prospect, Enya headed to New Zealand to see the preliminary edits of the film. Enya worked on the song with Nicky Ryan, her producer, and Roma Ryan, her lyricist. Nicky produced Enya's vocals and arranged the music while Roma wrote the lyrics. They recorded the song through Enya's contract with Warner Music in the Ryans' Dublin studio, Aigle Studio.

The vocals were recorded in "Aigle Studios", Enya's Studio near Dublin and the orchestration was recorded in London, directed by Howard Shore and performed by the London Voices and London Philharmonic Orchestra. Compositionally, the piece is simple, featuring a backdrop of choir and strings. As Doug Adams commented, Enya's contributions "coexist so neatly," with Shore's score, that "neither Enya song is relegated to its own track."

Lyrics 

The lyrics of this theme song include English words, as well as words in the fictional Elvish language, Quenya, created by J.R.R. Tolkien. While Enya wrote music, Roma Ryan studied the languages and wrote the lyrics in English and Quenya. There are two lines with phrases written in Quenya. The first, Mornië utúlië, translates to "Darkness has come." Mornië alantië translates as "Darkness has fallen." Each line repeats twice in the song, with the remaining song lyrics written in English. They are intermingled with the Quenya lyrics, as in the second stanza; "Mornië utúlië, believe and you will find your way; Mornië alantië, a promise lives within you now." Enya also performed another song "Aníron" for The Lord of the Rings, which is sung in another of Tolkien's Elvish languages, Sindarin.

Critical reception and awards 

"May It Be" was nominated for the 2002 Academy Award for Best Original Song, but lost to Randy Newman's "If I Didn't Have You" from Monsters, Inc., sung by John Goodman and Billy Crystal. It won the Las Vegas Film Critics Society Award for Best Song and the 2002 Critics' Choice Movie Award for Best Song. It was nominated for the 2002 Golden Globe Award for Best Original Song, but lost to "Until" from Kate & Leopold. The song received a 2003 Grammy Award nomination for Best Song Written for Visual Media.

Enya performed her song at the Academy Awards on 24 March 2002. She was "absolutely" excited about the performance. For her it was the "first time to be nominated, and to get to perform, it's just wonderful, absolutely wonderful."

Release 

Enya's "May It Be" has been featured on various albums. On 20 November 2001, it was released on The Lord of the Rings: The Fellowship of the Ring soundtrack, along with composer Howard Shore's original score "The Road Goes Ever On (Part 2)". It also came out as a single in Europe on 10 December 2001 and in the United Kingdom on 21 January 2002. "May It Be" entered the German Singles Chart at number one. It was Enya's second consecutive single to do so, following her song "Only Time". In 2005, it was released as part of the compilation The Lord of the Rings: The Fellowship of the Ring: The Complete Recordings. This time, the version of the song was identical as featured in the movie's ending titles. Enya also included the song on her 2009 album, The Very Best of Enya.

Music video 

The music video was directed by Peter Nydrle. It features clips from the film as well as Enya singing the song. The video runs for 3 minutes and 32 seconds.

Cover versions and samples 

Many other artists have covered the song since Enya's original recording. Tara Scammell did so on 2004 album Music from the Lord of the Rings Trilogy by the Prague Symphony Orchestra, which consists of songs from all three movies. Celtic Woman performed "May It Be" on their 2005 self-titled album. Lisa Kelly of Celtic Woman included it on her 2006 album, Lisa. Hayley Westenra recorded it in 2005 on her second international album, Odyssey. It was also covered in 2006 by Lex van Someren for Christmas Every Day and Angelis for their self-titled album. It was sung on Cecelia’s 2007 album, Amazing Grace. Sofia Källgren featured it on her 2008 album, Cinema Paradiso. Other artists who have covered it include Uruk-hai, Hayley Griffiths (on Celtic Rose), and Kiri Te Kanawa. It was performed on 14 January 2012 by Faroese artist Eivør Pálsdóttir as part of the celebration of Margrethe II's 40th anniversary as Queen of Denmark. Jackie Evancho covered "May It Be" on her 2017 album Two Hearts. Voces8 covered "May It Be" in their album Enchanted Isle in 2018. "May It Be" was sampled by Swiss DJ Dinka in her 2010 track "The Celtic of Scotland".

Track listings 

European CD single and UK cassette single
 "May It Be" – 3:30
 "Isobella" – 4:27

European maxi-CD single and UK CD single
 "May It Be" – 3:30
 "Isobella" – 4:27
 "The First of Autumn" – 3:08

Charts

Weekly charts

Year-end charts

Certifications

Release history

References

External links 
 [ May It Be] at Allmusic
 

2001 singles
2001 songs
Enya songs
The Lord of the Rings (film series) music
Number-one singles in Germany
Songs with lyrics by Roma Ryan
Songs with music by Enya